Moos may refer to:

People

Surname
 Alexandre Moos (born 1972), Swiss mountain biker
 Bill Moos, American athletic director
 Carl Moos (1878–1959), Swiss artist
 Carolyn Moos (born 1978), American basketball player
 David Moos (born 1965), Canadian-born art curator
 Dietmar Moos, West German slalom canoeist
 Gerald Moos, West German slalom canoeist
 Gustave Moos (1905–1948), Swiss Olympic cyclist
 Heinrich Moos (1895–1976), German Olympic fencer
 Jeanne Moos, American journalist
 Julie Moos (born 1966), Canadian photographer and art writer
 Ludwig von Moos (1910–1990), Swiss politician
 Lotte Moos (1909–2008) German-born poet and playwright
 Malcolm Moos (1916–1982), American political scientist
 Nanabhoy Ardeshir Framji Moos, 19th-century of Colaba Observatory in Mumbai, India
 Peder Moos (1906–1991), Danish furniture designer
 Salomon Moos (1831–1895), German otologist

First name

 Moos Linneman (born 1931), Dutch Olympic boxer
 Moos (singer) (born 1974), French singer

Places

 Moos in Passeier, South Tyrol, Italy
 Moos, Baden-Württemberg, in the district of Konstanz, Baden-Württemberg, Germany
 Moos, Bavaria, in the district of Deggendorf, Bavaria, Germany
 Moos (mountain), a mountain in the Black Forest of Germany

See also
 Moose
 Moo (disambiguation)
 Moss
Möös